PBH may refer to:

 Parboiled rice hulls
 Paro Airport
 Pratapgarh Junction railway station
 Price County Airport
 Primordial black hole
 Pro Beach Hockey